All I Want for Christmas is a 1991 American romantic comedy Christmas film directed by Robert Lieberman, and starring Harley Jane Kozak, Lauren Bacall, Thora Birch, Ethan Randall, and Leslie Nielsen. The score was composed by Bruce Broughton, including a theme-setting song by Stephen Bishop.

Plot
In New York City, siblings Ethan (Ethan Randall) and Hallie O'Fallon (Thora Birch) launch a scheme to get what they most want for Christmas. A scheme involving their parents, Catherine (Harley Jane Kozak) and Michael (Jamey Sheridan), and grandmother, Lillian (Lauren Bacall). When Hallie meets Santa Claus (Leslie Nielsen), she asks for an unusual gift: her divorced parents back together again.

As the children embark on their adventure, and while planning ahead, Tony Boer (Kevin Nealon) takes an interest in Catherine. Ethan gets pre-occupied with not only his parents' romantic dilemma, but also his own, one brought about by his new friendship with Stephanie (Amy Oberer). An elaborate scheme evolves with mice, telephone calls, and an ice cream truck, as Ethan and Hallie try to achieve their goal with help from Stephanie, and see Tony as their primary obstacle. They succeed with a little Christmas magic from Santa Claus. Catherine decides to reject Tony and remarry Michael, completing Hallie's wish. Stephanie and Ethan talk one more time as she gives him a kiss; they begin a relationship, and everyone lives happily ever after.

Cast
Harley Jane Kozak as Catherine O'Fallon
Jamey Sheridan as Michael O'Fallon
Ethan Randall as Ethan O'Fallon
Kevin Nealon as Tony Boer
Thora Birch as Hallie O'Fallon
Andrea Martin as Olivia
Lauren Bacall as Lillian Brooks
Amy Oberer as Stephanie
Renée Taylor as Sylvia
Leslie Nielsen as Santa Claus
Felicity LaFortune as Susan
Camille Saviola as Sonya
Marc Alaimo as Frankie (credited as "Michael Alaimo")
Josh Keaton as Brad
Elizabeth Cherney as Paige

Production
In June 1991, it was announced Thom Eberhardt was set to write and direct the film, which had two working titles, Home For Christmas and Home For the Holidays. One month later, various sources reported that Eberhardt had been replaced by director-producer Robert Lieberman, who was known primarily for television and commercial work. On 24 Jul 1991, HR stated that the picture was being rushed into production by Brandon Tartikoff, a former television executive and Paramount Pictures’ new chairman, with the goal of a 1991, rather than 1992, holiday-season opening. Shortly thereafter the film was given its release title All I Want For Christmas, would be his first for the studio. Due to the short shooting schedule as cause for Eberhardt amicably departed the film. Gail Parent and Neal Israel were the original co-writers of Eberhardt's script, but following re-writes by Richard Kramer both their names went uncredited.

Reception
The film was panned by critics.

Home media
The film was released on DVD on October 5, 2004. The film was also released in the digital format.

See also
List of American films of 1991
 List of Christmas films

References

External links

1990s Christmas comedy films
1991 romantic comedy films
1991 films
American Christmas comedy films
American romantic comedy films
Paramount Pictures films
Films scored by Bruce Broughton
Films directed by Robert Lieberman
1990s English-language films
1990s American films
Santa Claus in film